Winston Halapua (born 1945) is a Tongan-born Fijian retired Anglican bishop and academic. 

Consecrated a bishop on 10 April 2005, he served as suffragan/assistant bishop of the Diocese of Polynesia, for Polynesians in mainland New Zealand until 2010, when he became diocesan bishop of that Diocese. In becoming Bishop of Polynesia, he automatically became Senior Bishop of Tikanga Pasefika and therefore Archbishop of New Zealand & Primate of the Anglican Church in Aotearoa, New Zealand and Polynesia (one of three co-equal incumbents). On his retirement in August 2018, he was granted the honorary title "archbishop emeritus".

Selected works

References

Living people
Tongan Anglican bishops
Anglican bishops of Polynesia
1945 births
Fijian Anglicans
Tongan expatriates in Fiji
21st-century Anglican archbishops in New Zealand
Bishops in the Cook Islands